Abdollahabad (also Romanized as ʿAbdolllahābād) is a village in Negar Rural District, in the Central District of Bardsir County, Kerman Province, Iran. At the 2006 census, its population was 27, in 5 families.

References 

Populated places in Bardsir County